Murugappa Polytechnic College is a government-aided institution, the college is located in Avadi, Chennai, India. Diploma programmes Civil Engineering and Computer Engineering courses offered include Electrical &
Electronics Engineering, Mechanical Engineering etc.

Courses Offered
Diploma Programmes
 Civil Engineering
 Computer Engineering
 Electrical & Electronics Engineering
 Electronics & Communication Engineering
 Mechanical Engineering
 Mechanical Engineering (Tool & Die)
 Electronics (Robotics)

Infrastructure
 Hi-Tech Center
 Library
 Cricket Ground
 Volleyball Court
 Football Court
 Ball badminton Court
 Table tennis
 Carrom Board
 Chessboard
 Shuttle Badminton Court
 Tennikoit Court
 8 Station Multi Gym
 National Social Service
 National Cadet Corps

References

External links
 

Universities and colleges in Chennai
Educational institutions established in 1957
1957 establishments in Madras State